Zinc finger protein 557 is a protein that in humans is encoded by the ZNF557 gene.

References

Further reading 

Molecular biology
Proteins
Proteomics